"Glamorous Indie Rock & Roll" is a song by American rock band The Killers, included as a bonus track on the vinyl and European editions of their debut studio album, Hot Fuss (2004) and replaces "Change Your Mind" on the UK and Australian editions. The song was issued as a promotional single in the United Kingdom in 2004.

Overview
The lyrics are an ironic take on hipster culture. In August 2009, frontman Brandon Flowers told Time Out Chicago: "There's so much snobbery. You go through high school and all the paranoia and crap that goes with that. It's bullshit. I just didn't want to be like that. We like big songs and we're going to embrace it."

In an interview with Rolling Stone in September 2009, Flowers cited "Glamorous Indie Rock & Roll" as his least favorite Killers song, stating that hearing the song makes him want to "crawl under a rock". However, in a comeback show in 2011 at London's Scala, The Killers played the song live for the first time in four years, since the earlier legs of the Sam's Town Tour. The following day, The Killers opened with "Glamorous Indie Rock & Roll" during their headlining act at Hard Rock Calling in Hyde Park, London.

Release and reception
"Glamorous Indie Rock & Roll" was released as a promotional single in the United Kingdom in 2004, due to its popularity among fans. It became a regular number in the setlist until the end of the Sam's Town Tour.

A re-recorded version of the song is featured on The Killers' compilation album Sawdust (2007).

Although not officially a single in the United States, the song reached number 13 on the Billboard Bubbling Under Hot 100 Singles chart and number 71 on the Billboard Pop 100 chart.

Charts

References

2004 singles
2004 songs
The Killers songs
Songs about rock music
Songs written by Brandon Flowers
Songs written by Dave Keuning
Songs written by Mark Stoermer
Songs written by Ronnie Vannucci Jr.